Fuzhou or Fu Prefecture was a zhou (prefecture) in imperial China in modern Fujian, China, seated in modern Fuzhou. It existed (intermittently) from 725 until 1278.

It was known as Changle Prefecture between 933 and 948 when it was the capital of Min. It was also briefly known as Fu'an Prefecture between 1276 and 1277 when it was the capital of the Song dynasty.

The modern prefecture-level city Fuzhou retains its name.

References

 
 
 

Prefectures of the Tang dynasty
Prefectures of Min Kingdom
Prefectures of Wuyue
Prefectures of the Song dynasty
Former prefectures in Fujian
725 establishments
8th-century establishments in China
1278 disestablishments in Asia
13th-century disestablishments in China